Ellerman bombs are small-scale brightenings in the Sun's lower chromosphere. They typically take place in areas with strong magnetic fields and near emerging flux regions. They are named after Ferdinand Ellerman who studied them in detail in the 20th century. The phenomenon was first reported by W. M. Mitchell in early 1900. Although Ellerman first described them in 1917, the physical mechanism behind them is still debated.

References

Solar phenomena